Epixerus ebii, also known as Ebian's palm squirrel, Temminck's giant squirrel, or the western palm squirrel, is a species of rodent in the family Sciuridae. It is the only species in the genus Epixerus, although eastern populations (subspecies Epixerus ebii wilsoni) were previously regarded as a separate species, E. wilsoni. It is found in West and Central Africa. Its natural habitat is subtropical or tropical moist lowland forests. It is threatened by habitat loss.

References

 
Mammals of West Africa
Fauna of Central Africa
Mammals described in 1853
Taxa named by Oldfield Thomas
Taxonomy articles created by Polbot